Chen Kuo-fu (born 13 May 1958) is a Taiwanese film director, screenwriter and producer. His film The Personals was screened in the Un Certain Regard section at the 1999 Cannes Film Festival.

Biography
Born in 1958 Chen worked as a film critic before debuting as a director in 1989 with School Girl. In the 1990s, he continued to explore the female perspective with Treasure Island, The Peony Pavilion (inspired by traditional drama of the same name) and anti-romantic comedy The Personals. The latter, in which a single woman searches for Mr. Right on a series of blind dates, screened in Cannes' Un Certain Regard sidebar and was distributed in Asia, Europe and North America.

In 2000 Chen became the head of the production unit of the Asian branch of Columbia Pictures. Here he accumulated experience in international film making and connections to young Chinese directors such as Feng Xiaogang. With these he would later join Huayi Brothers Media Corporation and continue his works in China.

In 2001 Chen began to concentrate on feature film production beginning with Su Chao-Bin's youth comedy Better Than Sex through his company Nan Fang Film Productions. The following year, he directed and produced the supernatural thriller Double Vision. The film was distributed internationally by co-producer Columbia Pictures.

In 2009 Chen served as an executive producer of China's then highest grossing domestic film of all time, Feng Xiaogang's romantic drama If You Are the One.

Filmography
 School Girl (1989)
 Treasure Island (1993)
 The Peony Pavilion (1996)
 The Personals (1998)
 Double Vision (2002)
 The Message (2009 - co-dir: Gao Qunshu
 Detective Dee and the Mystery of the Phantom Flame (2010 - writer only)
 Young Detective Dee: Rise of the Sea Dragon (2013 - writer and producer only)
 Detective Dee: The Four Heavenly Kings (2018 - producer only)
 The Yinyang Master (2021)

References

External links

1958 births
Living people
Taiwanese film directors
Taiwanese screenwriters
Taiwanese film producers